The following is a list of the municipalities (comuni) of Sicily, Italy.

There are 390 municipalities in Sicily (as of January 2019):

43 in the Province of Agrigento
22 in the Province of Caltanissetta
58 in the Metropolitan City of Catania
20 in the Province of Enna
108 in the Metropolitan City of Messina
82 in the Metropolitan City of Palermo
12 in the Province of Ragusa
21 in the Province of Syracuse
24 in the Province of Trapani

List

See also
List of municipalities of Italy

References

 
Populated places in Sicily
Sicily